For the 2018 FIFA World Cup qualification, there were two scheduled inter-confederation play-offs to determine the final two qualification spots to the 2018 FIFA World Cup. The matches were originally scheduled to be played between 6–14 November 2017, and later confirmed to take place between 10 and 15 November.

Format
The draw for the inter-confederation play-offs was held as part of the 2018 FIFA World Cup Preliminary Draw on 25 July 2015, starting 18:00 MSK (UTC+3), at the Konstantinovsky Palace in Strelna, Saint Petersburg.

The four teams from the four confederations (AFC, CONCACAF, CONMEBOL, and OFC) were drawn into two ties. There was no seeding.

In each tie, the two teams played a two-legged home-and-away series. The two winners, decided on aggregate score, qualified for the 2018 FIFA World Cup in Russia. If the aggregate score was level, the away goals rule was applied, i.e. the team that scored more goals away from home over the two legs advanced. If away goals were also equal, then thirty minutes of extra time would be played. The away goals rule would again be applied after extra time, i.e. if there were goals scored during extra time and the aggregate score was still level, the visiting team would advance by virtue of more away goals scored. If no goals were scored during extra time, the tie would be decided by a penalty shoot-out.

Qualified teams

Matches
The first legs were played on 10 and 11 November 2017, and the second legs were played on 15 November 2017.

CONCACAF v AFC

Australia won 3–1 on aggregate and qualified for the 2018 FIFA World Cup.

OFC v CONMEBOL

Peru won 2–0 on aggregate and qualified for the 2018 FIFA World Cup.

Goalscorers
3 goals

 Mile Jedinak

1 goal

 Alberth Elis
 Jefferson Farfán
 Christian Ramos

References

External links

Qualifiers, FIFA.com

Play-Off

FIFA World Cup qualifcation